This is a list of Golden Gate University people, including notable students, alumni, faculty, and administrators associated.

Alumni

There are more than 60,000 living alumni. Alumni with a degree of Juris Doctor (JD) graduated from the Golden Gate University School of Law.

Academia
 Solomon Darwin (MBA), professor of business at the University of California, Berkeley

Arts and entertainment
 Denise Mobolaji Ajayi-Williams (MBA), novelist and children's comic writer
 Kyra Davis (BS), novelist; author of Just One Night series and Sophie Katz series
 Gary W. Goldstein (JD 1978), author, speaker, filmmaker, and producer of Pretty Woman
 Diane Murphy (MBA), former child actress, known for sharing the role of "Tabitha" in Bewitched
 Tess Uriza Holthe (BS 1996), novelist; author of When the Elephants Dance
 Emily Wu (MBA), writer; author of Feather in the Storm: A Childhood Lost in Chaos

Business
 Ralph Atkin (MBA), founder of SkyWest Airlines
 Sophia Bekele (MBA), founder of DotConnectAfrica, corporate executive, international entrepreneur
 Richard Belluzzo (BS 1975), former CEO of Quantum Corp; former president and COO of Microsoft
 Joan Blades (JD 1980), businessperson, author, and co-founder of MoveOn.org
 Pollyanna Chu (BA), CEO of the Kingston Financial Group
 Bruce Gilliat (BS), co-founder and former CEO of Alexa Internet
 John C. Martin (MBA), former CEO (1996–2016) and Chairman (2016–18) of Gilead Sciences
 Monique Morrow (MS), former CTO of Cisco Systems (2012–16)
 Glen Schofield (MBA), co-founder and General Manager of Sledgehammer Games
 William H. Swanson (MBA), former chairman and CEO of Raytheon Company (2004–14)
 Bernard Tyson (BS, MBA), former chairman and CEO of Kaiser Permanente (2012–19)
 Dave Yeske (DBA 2010), financial planner, researcher, and educator

Government and politics
 Sam Aanestad (MPA 1991), California State Senator (2002–10); California State Assemblymember (1998–2002)
 David Briley (JD 1995), 8th Mayor of Nashville, Tennessee (2018–19); Vice Mayor of Nashville (2015–18)
 Violeta Bulc (MSIT), European Commissioner for Transport (2014–19); Deputy Prime Minister of Slovenia (2014)
 Phillip Burton (LL.B. 1952), United States Representative (1964–83); California State Assemblymember (1957–64)
 Craig E. Campbell (MPA 1981), 10th Lt. Governor of Alaska
 George Christopher (BA 1930), 34th Mayor of San Francisco (1956–64)
 Cecilia Chung (BS), civil rights and LGBT rights activist
 Sam Clovis (MBA), White House Advisor to the United States Department of Agriculture (2017–18); national co-chair of Donald Trump's presidential campaign
 Peter Corroon (JD 1995), 2nd Mayor of Salt Lake County, Utah (2004–13); Chair of the Utah Democratic Party (2014–17)
 Dave Cox (MS 1983), California State Senator (2004–10); California State Assemblymember (1998–2004)
 Michael Flynn (MBA 1989), 25th U.S. National Security Advisor (2017), Director of the Defense Intelligence Agency (2012–14)
 Gong Zheng (1987, attended), Mayor of Shanghai (2020–present); Governor of Shandong (2017–2020)
 Thom Goolsby (MBA), North Carolina State Senator (2011–14)
 Mary Hayashi (MBA), California State Assemblymember (2006–12); first Korean-American woman to serve in the California State Legislature
 J. J. Jelincic (MBA), CalPERS board member (elected), former president of the California State Employees Association
 Ed Jew (MBA 1984), San Francisco Supervisor (2006–07)
 Linda J. LeZotte (LL.M. 1983), Director of the Santa Clara Valley Water District (2010–present); San Jose City Councilmember (1998–2006)
 Fiona Ma (MS 1993), California State Treasurer (2019–present); California Board of Equalization Member (2015–19); California State Assemblymember (2006–12); San Francisco Supervisor (2002–06)
 Melvin T. Mason (BA), civil rights activist and educator; 1984 presidential candidate of the Socialist Workers Party
 Ross Mirkarimi (MA), Sheriff of San Francisco (2012–16); San Francisco Supervisor (2005–12); co-founder of the Green Party of California
 Dick Muri (MPA 1988), Washington State Representative (2013–19); Pierce County Councilmember (2003–12)
 Louis M. Pate Jr. (BS 1978, MBA 1980), North Carolina State Senator (2011–19); North Carolina General Assemblymember (1995–96; 2003–08)
 Denise Phua (MBA), Mayor of Central Singapore District (2014–present); Member of Singapore Parliament (2006–present)
 Joseph Pitre (MPA), New Hampshire Representative (2010–present)
 Richard Rainey (MPA 1976), HUD Regional Administrator (2003–09); California State Senator (1996–2000); California State Assemblymember (1992–96)
 Said Tayeb Jawad (EMBA 2001), Ambassador of Afghanistan to the United States (2003–2010); Ambassador of Afghanistan to the United Kingdom of Great Britain and Northern Ireland (2017–present)
 George E. Wallace (MPA), Mayor of Hampton, Virginia (2013–2016)
 Betty Yee (MPA 1981), 32nd California State Controller (2015–present); California Board of Equalization Member (2004–15)

Law and justice
 Diana Becton (JD 1985), District Attorney of Contra Costa County (2017–present)
 John Burris (BA 1967), Oakland civil rights and police brutality attorney
 Jesse W. Carter (JD 1913), Associate Justice of the Supreme Court of California (1939–59); California State Senator from the 5th district (1939–39)
 Morgan Christen (JD 1986), Judge of the United States Court of Appeals for the Ninth Circuit (2012–present); Associate Justice of the Alaska Supreme Court (2009–12)
 Miguel S. Demapan (MBA 1983), 3rd Chief Justice of the Supreme Court of the Commonwealth of the Northern Mariana Islands (1999–2011)
 C. J. Goodell (LL.B. 1909), Associate Justice of the California Court of Appeal, First District (1945–1953)
 G. Randy Kasten (JD 1982), attorney and author
 George Malek-Yonan (1964, attended), international attorney, politician, and athlete
 Bruce William Nickerson (JD), civil rights and gay rights attorney
 Lawrence Joseph O'Neill (MPA 1976), Judge of the United States District Court for the Eastern District of California (2007–present)
 Cindy Ossias (JD 1983), lawyer and California Department of Insurance whistleblower
 Susan Pamerleau (MPA 1978), United States Marshal for the Western District of Texas (2018–present); Sheriff of Bexar County, Texas (2013–16)
 Philip M. Pro (JD 1972), Judge of the United States District Court for the District of Nevada (1987–2015)
 Ira P. Rothken (JD 1992), high technology attorney and computer scientist
 Prentice E. Sanders (BA 1975, MPA 1977), first African American Chief of the San Francisco Police Department (2002–03)
 Mike Terrizzi (JD 1981), community association lawyer and former Purdue quarterback
 Hanna Thompson (JD 2013), attorney and 2008 Olympics silver-medalist fencer
 Paul Traub (JD 1977), bankruptcy and business lawyer
 Adolph Washauer (LL.B. 1932) Inductee of the National Soccer Hall of Fame

Military
 C. Donald Alston (MBA 1986), United States Air Force Major General (ret.)
 Andrew E. Busch (MPA 1981), Director of the Defense Logistics Agency (2014–17); United States Air Force Lieutenant General (ret.)
 Herbert J. Carlisle (MBA 1988), United States Air Force Four-Star General (ret.); former commander of Air Combat Command and Pacific Air Forces
 Bruce P. Crandall (MPA), United States Army Lieutenant Colonel (ret.); helicopter pilot, Battle of Ia Drang, Vietnam; Medal of Honor recipient
 Gregory A. Feest (MBA 1985), United States Air Force Major General (ret.)
 Burton M. Field (MBA 1986), United States Air Force Lieutenant General (ret.)
 Fitzhugh L. Fulton (BA), test pilot at NASA's Dryden Flight Research Center; United States Air Force Lieutenant Colonel (ret.)
 Terence T. Henricks (MPA 1982), test pilot and Commander of the Space Shuttle Columbia; United States Air Force Colonel (ret.)
 John P. Jumper (MBA 1979), 17th Chief of Staff of the United States Air Force (2001–2005); United States Air Force Four-Star General (ret.); former CEO of SAIC
 Thaddeus J. Martin (MPA 1985), Adjutant General of the Connecticut National Guard (2005–18); United States Air Force Major General (ret.)
 Timothy Maude (BA), United States Army Deputy Chief of Staff for Personnel killed in the September 11 attacks; United States Army Lieutenant General
 Gary L. North (MPA 1984), United States Air Force Four-Star General (ret.); former commander of Pacific Air Forces
 Bobby V. Page (MPA 1978), Deputy Chief of Chaplains of the United States Air Force (2012–16); United States Air Force Brigadier General (ret.)
 J. Gregory Pavlovich (MPA 1985), United States Air Force Brigadier General (ret.); former commander of 45th Space Wing
 Charles J. Precourt (MS 1988), NASA astronaut; Space Shuttle pilot and commander; United States Air Force Colonel (ret.)
 John W. Rosa (MPA 1985), 16th Superintendent of the United States Air Force Academy (2003–05); United States Air Force Lieutenant General (ret.)
 Herbert R. Temple, Jr. (BS 1974), Chief of the National Guard Bureau (1986–90); United States Army Lieutenant General (ret.)
 Lam Quang Thi (MBA), Army of the Republic of Vietnam Lieutenant General

Science and technology
 Cem Kaner (JD 1994), software engineering professor; co-founder of Association for Software Testing
 Edward J. Wasp (MBA), engineer and inventor who developed long distance slurry pipelines

Faculty 

Faculty who were also alumni are listed in bold font, with degree and year in parentheses.
 Dan Angel, President of Golden Gate University (2007–15); Member of the Michigan House of Representatives from the 49th district (1973–1978)
 Rebecca Bauer-Kahan, California State Assemblymember from the 16th district (2018–present); former law school professor
 Colin Crawford, 16th Dean of Golden Gate University School of Law (2021–present)
 George N. Crocker, Dean of Golden Gate University School of Law (1934–41)
 Thelton Henderson, Judge of the United States District Court for the Northern District of California (1980–present; inactive); associate law professor (1978–80)
 Gerald Sanford Levin, Judge of the United States District Court for the Northern District of California (1969–71) and San Francisco County Superior Court, law school instructor
 Andrew McClurg, law professor and legal humorist
 Shannon Minter, civil rights attorney and legal director of the National Center for Lesbian Rights
 Anthony Niedwiecki, Dean of Golden Gate University School of Law (2017–2020), former Vice-Mayor of Oakland Park, FL, co-founder of Fight OUT Loud
 Riall Nolan, anthropologist and Dean of International Affairs and Programs at Golden Gate University (1995–98)
 Cecil F. Poole, Judge of the United States Court of Appeals for the Ninth Circuit (1979–97) and United States District Court for the Northern District of California (1976–80), United States Attorney for the Northern District of California (1961–70), law school instructor
 Renny Pritikin, chief curator of Contemporary Jewish Museum; art administration instructor
 Donna Ryu, U.S. Magistrate Judge of the United States District Court for the Northern District of California (2010–present); clinical law school professor
 Carol Ruth Silver, Member of the San Francisco Board of Supervisors (1978–89); Freedom Riders and civil liberties activist; law school professor
 Lidia S. Stiglich, Associate Justice of the Nevada Supreme Court (2016–present); adjunct law professor
 Caspar Weinberger, 15th United States Secretary of Defense (1981–87), 10th United States Secretary of Health and Human Services (1973–75), law school instructor
 Kandis Westmore, U.S. Magistrate Judge of the United States District Court for the Northern District of California (2012–present); adjunct professor of Honors Evidence
 Henry Travillion Wingate, Judge of the United States District Court for the Southern District of Mississippi (1985–2010), adjunct law school instructor (1975–76)
 Dave Yeske (DBA 2010), financial planner, Distinguished Adjunct Professor at the Ageno School of Business

Presidents
Prior to 1948, the top executive was called the Educational Director.

References

Golden Gate University people
Golden Gate University